East Garton is a civil parish in the East Riding of Yorkshire, England.

The civil parish is formed by the village of Garton and the hamlets of Fitling and Grimston.

According to the 2011 UK census, East Garton parish had a population of 199, a decrease on the 2001 UK census figure of 219.

References

Civil parishes in the East Riding of Yorkshire